This article lists Japanese typographic symbols that are not included in kana or kanji groupings. The usages of these symbols are unique and specific.

Repetition marks

Brackets and quotation marks

Phonetic marks

Punctuation marks

Other special marks

Organization-specific symbols

See also
 Japanese map symbols
 Japanese punctuation
 Emoji, which originated in Japanese mobile phone culture

References
Japanese Symbols Retrieved 18 December 2022.

Typographic symbols
Japanese typographic symbols
Japanese typographic symbols
Japanese typographic symbols
East Asian typography